Jothi (alternatively titled Sri Jyothi Ramalinga Swamigal) is an Indian Tamil language film directed by T. R. Raghunath and was released in 1939. It is the life story of Saint Ramalinga Swamigal popularly known as Vallalar. No print of the film is known to survive, making it a lost film.

Cast 
K. A. Muthu Bhagavathar as Ramalinga SwamigalP. G. VenkatesanV. B. Ramaiah as Ramalinga Swamigal's fatherM. G. ChakrapaniT. V. JanakamK. S. Sankara IyerK. S. VelayudhamMiss. Madurai A. Sundaram as Ramalinga Swamigal's motherSaravanabhavanandarN. S. KrishnanT. A. MathuramP. S. KrishnaveniM. R. SwaminathanK. K. SoundarB. GopalM. R. SubramaniamV. Nataraj‘Master’ Ramudu as Child Ramalinga Swamigal‘Master’ Mahadevan as teenager Ramalinga SwamigalRajammalT. M. PattammalM. S. KannammalH. S. TawkarS. R. SamiRamalakshmi‘Master’ Muthu

Crew 
 Director: T. R. Raghunath
 Screenplay: Pammal Sambandha Mudaliar
 Dialogues: C. A. Lakshmanadas
 Cinematography: A. Kapoor
 Audiography: V. B. Dathe
 Studio: Bharath Lakshmi Pictures Studio (Calcutta)

Soundtrack 
Madurai Mariappa Swamigal scored the music and wrote the lyrics. This is the first film where he worked as music director. Singers are: P. G. Venkatesan, Muthuswamy, N. S. Krishnan and T. A. Mathuram.

References

External links 
Some Songs from the film

1939 films
1930s Tamil-language films
Hindu mythological films
Hindu devotional films
Indian biographical films
Indian films based on actual events
Lost Indian films
1939 lost films
Films directed by T. R. Raghunath